James Sun (is an entrepreneur, television host, and public speaker.  He is the owner of Dramabeans.com and Beautytap.com  He is the former CEO and Founder of Pirq.com, which was acquired by iPayment, Inc. He was the host of a BBC television program called Sun Tzu War on Business.
Sun appeared on Season 6 of Donald Trump's reality show The Apprentice.

He was chosen to be the host of "Celebrate Asia" with the Seattle Symphony on January 14, 2011, and opened the event as the Master of Ceremonies.

The Apprentice
Sun was one of the four finalists going into the finale of season 6 of The Apprentice, Donald Trump's business reality show. He and Stefani Schaeffer survived the first elimination, but Trump ultimately chose Stefani as his next apprentice. On his blog following the firing, Sun stated that he was "dumbfounded" and confused as to what exactly the "things" Trump mentioned were, although he speculated that it might have been his decision to use the program to plug his Internet company.

References

External links
 Zoodango Official Site

Year of birth missing (living people)
American computer businesspeople
American technology chief executives
American technology company founders
American television hosts
Businesspeople from Seattle
Deloitte people
Living people
People from Houston
People from Seoul
South Korean emigrants to the United States
The Apprentice (franchise) contestants
Participants in American reality television series